Winnipeg Junction is a ghost town in section 22 of Highland Grove Township in Clay County, Minnesota United States.

History
Winnipeg Junction was established in 1887 when the Northern Pacific Railroad was extended to that point.  The town developed rapidly and within twenty years had a church, three stores, three saloons, two restaurants, two hotels, a bakery, a grain elevator, a school, three livery stables, and a post office which operated from 1887 until 1910. In 1909, however, the railroad moved its line to a more favorable grade, and the town subsequently died, its businesses and residents moving to the adjacent communities of Manitoba Junction and Dale. Little trace of the town remains today.

Notes

Former populated places in Minnesota
Former populated places in Clay County, Minnesota